Miss Arkansas USA, previously known as Miss Arkansas Universe, is the beauty pageant that selects the representative for the state of Arkansas in the Miss USA pageant, and the name of the title held by that winner. The pageant is directed by Vanbros and Associates.

The current Miss Arkansas USA is Rylie Wagner of Ozark, Arkansas and was crowned on April 10, 2022. Wagner represented Arkansas for the title at Miss USA 2022.

Arkansas's most successful placement was in 1982, when Terri Utley was crowned Miss USA. The most recent placement was Savannah Skidmore in 2019 who placed in the Top 5, the state's highest placement since 1982. Five Miss Arkansas USA titleholders were former Miss Arkansas Teen USA titleholders who competed at Miss Teen USA. The longest reigning titleholder was Haley Rose Pontius in 2020, having held the title for 18 months, while the shortest titleholder was Stephanie Barber in 2021, having held the title for 10 months and 18 days.

The state pageant was directed by Premier Pageants from 2002 to 2007 before becoming part of the Vanbros organization, headquartered in Lenexa, Kansas. In 2018, Vanbros chose Fort Smith, Arkansas as the new host city of the pageant. Other host cities for the pageant have included Bentonville, Little Rock, Magnolia, and West Memphis.

Gallery of titleholders

Results summary

Placements
Miss USA: Terri Utley (1982)
1st Runner-Up: Margaret Haywood (1955)
2nd Runner-Up: Nancy McCollum (1956)
Top 5: Savannah Skidmore (2019)
Top 10: Chanley Painter (2009), Abby Floyd (2016)
Top 15/16: Jineane Marie Ford (1954), Helen Garrott (1957), Donna Needham (1959), Ann Smithwick  (1968), Mary Dial (1970), Jessica Furrer (2005), Adrielle Churchill (2010), Kelsey Dow (2012)

Arkansas holds a record of 14 placements at Miss USA.

Awards 

 Miss Photogenic: Jennifer Sherrill (2004)

Winners 
Color key

Notes

References

External links
 Official Website
 

Arkansas
Arkansas culture
Women in Arkansas
1952 establishments in Arkansas
Recurring events established in 1952